Liza Pusztai (born 11 May 2001) is a Hungarian fencer. She represented Hungary at the 2020 Summer Olympics held in Tokyo, Japan. In 2018, she won the gold medal in the girls' sabre event at the Summer Youth Olympics held in Buenos Aires, Argentina. She also won the gold medal in the mixed team event.

Career 

At the 2017 European Fencing Championships in Tbilisi, Georgia, she won one of the bronze medals in the women's sabre event. In 2018, she won the gold medal in the women's sabre event at the Hungarian Fencing Championships held in Budapest, Hungary. In 2019, she won the silver medal in the women's team sabre event at the European Fencing Championships in Düsseldorf, Germany.

In 2021, she competed in the women's sabre event at the 2020 Summer Olympics held in Tokyo, Japan where she was eliminated in her second match by Qian Jiarui of China. She also competed in the women's team sabre event. The Hungarian team finished in 8th place.

World Championship

European Championship

Grand Prix

World Cup

Awards
Hungarian Fencer of the Year: 2018, 2020

References

External links 

 

Living people
2001 births
Place of birth missing (living people)
Hungarian female sabre fencers
Fencers at the 2018 Summer Youth Olympics
Medalists at the 2018 Summer Youth Olympics
Youth Olympic gold medalists for Hungary
Fencers at the 2020 Summer Olympics
Olympic fencers of Hungary
World Fencing Championships medalists
21st-century Hungarian women